Eugene Goodman (born 1980) is an American United States Capitol Police officer who diverted invading rioters from the United States Senate chamber during the January 6 Capitol attack. Goodman is a U.S. Army veteran who served during the Iraq War. He served as the Acting Deputy Sergeant at Arms of the United States Senate from January 20, 2021, to March 2, 2021.

On February 12, 2021, the Senate adopted a resolution awarding Goodman the Congressional Gold Medal. On January 6, 2023, President Joe Biden awarded him the Presidential Citizens Medal.

Early life 
Goodman was born in 1980 and raised in the southeast section of Washington, D.C. He served from 2002 to 2006 in the United States Army, including in combat with the 101st Airborne Division in the Iraq War. As a sergeant deployed to Iraq in 2005, Goodman led a 10-man squad in the Sunni triangle area that conducted patrols and identified improvised explosive devices requiring detonation. He was described by members of his military company as "calm, cool, and collected".

Goodman left the military in 2006. By 2009, he was a member of the U.S. Capitol Police.

Responding to the 2021 Capitol attack 
On Wednesday, January 6, 2021, rioting supporters of Donald Trump breached the United States Capitol building when, unaccompanied by other officers, Goodman confronted them. He has been cited for heroism in baiting and diverting the rioters away from the Senate chamber in the minutes before the chamber could be safely evacuated. As the crowd of rioters reached a landing from which there was an unimpeded path to the chamber, Goodman pushed the lead person, Doug Jensen, and then deliberately retreated away from the chamber, enticing the crowd to chase him in another direction. One media report described his actions as follows:
In short, he tricked them, willingly becoming the rabbit to their wolf pack, pulling them away from the chambers where armed officers were waiting, avoiding tragedy and saving lives. Lives which include their own.

Those present at the time of the event, including Democratic and Republican legislators and members of the press, praised Goodman for his quick thinking and brave actions. Republican Senator Ben Sasse credited Goodman with having "single-handedly prevented untold bloodshed".

Goodman's former unit, the XVIII Airborne Corps, issued a statement shortly after the riot, commending his valor and saying that he "was a hero long before last Wednesday".

Goodman's actions were captured in video footage taken by HuffPost reporter Igor Bobic. Bobic's footage of Goodman went viral on the internet, receiving more than 10 million views. A second video of Goodman's confrontation with the crowd was published by ProPublica on January 15.

Goodman's actions have been credited with saving the lives of those who remained in the chambers of Congress, those in the hallways who were attempting to evacuate, and the rioters themselves, who might otherwise have drawn forceful responses as with Ashli Babbitt, the woman who was shot while approaching the House chamber.

A video released on February 10, 2021, during the second impeachment trial of Donald Trump, showed Goodman leading Senator Mitt Romney away from approaching rioters during the January 6 attack.

Honors 

Following the attack on the Capitol, Jaime Harrison and others called for Goodman to be awarded the Congressional Gold Medal. A bipartisan resolution (H.Res.305) was introduced on January 13, 2021, by Representatives Charlie Crist (D-FL), Emanuel Cleaver (D-MO), and Nancy Mace (R-SC) to award the medal to Goodman.

Rep. Cleaver, one of the three original co-sponsors of the bill, wrote that, "[i]f not for the quick, decisive, and heroic actions from Officer Goodman, the tragedy of last week's insurrection could have multiplied in magnitude to levels never before seen in American history. With this prestigious award, we can show our gratitude to Officer Goodman for saving countless lives and defending our democracy."

Goodman also was awarded the Distinguished Public Service Award by both the secretary and chief of staff of the U.S. Army.

In addition, online petitions at Care2 and Change.org to award the Presidential Medal of Freedom to Goodman had received more than 83,500 signatures as of January 21, 2021. Following the event, Goodman said he was not looking for any accolades and expressed concern about potentially being targeted by extremists, but he insisted that he would "do the same thing again".

On January 20, 2021, Goodman escorted Kamala Harris to her inauguration as the Vice President of the United States. He was announced as the Acting Deputy Sergeant at Arms of the United States Senate; when stepping out onto the inauguration platform ahead of Harris, he received a standing ovation and cheers from those attending the ceremony.

Medals
Presidential Citizens Medal, 2023

On February 12, 2021, the U.S. Senate voted by unanimous consent to bestow the Congressional Gold Medal on Eugene Goodman. He had been invited to attend the proceedings and was present in the Senate Chamber for the vote, at which time, Goodman received a standing ovation from the members. On August 5, 2021, both chambers passed a concurrent resolution to award the Congressional Gold Medal to "The United States Capitol Police and those who protected the U.S. Capitol on January 6, 2021," without specific reference to Goodman. As of 2022, no action has been taken in the House of Representatives to agree to the Senate's resolution awarding Goodman an individual Congressional Gold Medal. Both chambers must pass a concurrent resolution for an award to be conferred.

See also 
 Kevin Vickers – Canadian politician and former Sergeant-at-Arms of the Canadian House of Commons who helped stop the 2014 shootings at Parliament Hill, Ottawa

References

External links 
 
  by The Washington Post channel, January 16, 2021
 

Defending officers during the January 6 United States Capitol attack
African-American government officials
African-American United States Army personnel
African-American police officers
Congressional Gold Medal recipients
Date of birth unknown
Living people
Military personnel from Washington, D.C.
People from Southeast (Washington, D.C.)
United States Army personnel of the Iraq War
United States Army non-commissioned officers
United States Capitol Police officers
Year of birth uncertain
Presidential Citizens Medal recipients
1980 births